Point Wells is a rural settlement in the Auckland Region of New Zealand, at the tip of a peninsula between the Omaha River and Whangateau Harbour. Omaha is across the harbour but accessible by a causeway.

Point Wells was divided into sections in 1947 when a local farmer sold off some of his land. It grew slowly, and in the late 1960s the development of Omaha drew most of the new builds away.

Point Wells Hall was built in 1956 on donated land. It included a community library for many years. In 2008, the community gave control of running the hall to Rodney District Council, and two years later when Auckland Council was established it took the responsibility. In 2018, Auckland Council handed back the management to a subcommittee of the Point Wells Community and Ratepayers Association.

Demographics
Point Wells is part of the larger Tawharanui Peninsula statistical area.

Port Wells, comprising the statistical areas of 7001239, 7001240 and 7001241, had a population of 513 at the 2018 New Zealand census, an increase of 123 people (31.5%) since the 2013 census, and an increase of 159 people (44.9%) since the 2006 census. There were 210 households, comprising 243 males and 270 females, giving a sex ratio of 0.9 males per female, with 81 people (15.8%) aged under 15 years, 42 (8.2%) aged 15 to 29, 222 (43.3%) aged 30 to 64, and 162 (31.6%) aged 65 or older.

Ethnicities were 96.5% European/Pākehā, 7.6% Māori, 1.8% Pacific peoples, 0.6% Asian, and 0.6% other ethnicities. People may identify with more than one ethnicity.

Although some people chose not to answer the census's question about religious affiliation, 60.8% had no religion, 29.2% were Christian, 0.6% had Māori religious beliefs and 0.6% had other religions.

Of those at least 15 years old, 108 (25.0%) people had a bachelor's or higher degree, and 57 (13.2%) people had no formal qualifications. 93 people (21.5%) earned over $70,000 compared to 17.2% nationally. The employment status of those at least 15 was that 174 (40.3%) people were employed full-time and 87 (20.1%) were part-time.

Notes

Matakana Coast
Rodney Local Board Area
Populated places in the Auckland Region